The Republican Christian Party is a political party in Ukraine registered July 1997.

History
The party ran independently at the 1998 Ukrainian parliamentary election winning 0.54% and no seats.

At the legislative elections of 30 March 2002, the party was part of the Viktor Yushchenko Bloc Our Ukraine. It did not participate in the 2006 Ukrainian parliamentary election. In the 30 September 2007 elections, the party failed as part of the Ukrainian Regional Asset to win parliamentary representation.

During the 2010 Ukrainian local elections the party won 1 representatives in the Lviv Oblast Council (regional parliament). In the council of Lviv the party won 3 seats.

The party did not participate in the 2012 parliamentary elections. And again did not participate in the 2014 Ukrainian parliamentary election.

References

External links
Official party website

1997 establishments in Ukraine
Christian political parties in Ukraine
Political parties established in 1997